Mannina is a genus of moths in the subfamily Arctiinae erected by Harrison Gray Dyar Jr. in 1916. Both species can be found in Mexico.

Species
Mannina hagnoleuca Dyar, 1916
Mannina cninateca Turrent, 2017

References

Arctiini